Abra Pampa is a town and municipality in Jujuy Province in Argentina, and is the capital of the Department of Cochinoca. The city is the economic center and communication of the Puna, it is the second town in importance in the region, after La Quiaca which is 73 km to the north by the Ruta Nacional 9, paved road, which also connects with the provincial capital, 224 km away.

Toponymy
The name Abra Pampa is a mix of the archaic Spanish word common among sailors -  'abra' (short opening), which in the region has the meaning of ravine, and 'pampa' is a Quechua word meaning 'plain', i.e., 'ravine' (and) 'plain', in fact, this city is located on a plateau near several canyons, especially areas that lie to the east and that connect with the Chaco Pampean regions of Argentina.

History
The city was founded on August 31, 1883, in the department of Cochinoca 22 km east of the ancient village of Cochinoca. In 1915 it moved to the old village of Puna in its political functions as departmental capital. During this time, the core business was mining. The new village was called "La Siberia Argentina" because of the extreme cold and rigor of its climate. The name was unpopular, and was renamed the way it had always been known, as Abra Pampa.

Puna began to be settled approximately 13,000 years ago. For the first thousand years of human life in Puna, everything revolved around hunting and gathering: they hunted birds, rheas, vizcachas, llamas and vicuna; gathered root vegetables, eggs and the scarce fruits of the Puna vegetation. The environment forced them into a form of dispersed and unstable settlement. The first groups of farmers began appearing 3000 years ago.

The town seems to have been an ideal form of population settlement and was the only type of concentrated zone until relatively recently. Abra Pampa and La Quiaca are the largest urban agglomerations within Jujuy, Puna. This entire area was and still is the home of the Quechua and Aymara which were dominated by the Incas from 1475.

These populations were under the influence of the Inca Empire and maintained a close relationship with it. The famous Inca Trail passed through Puna, connecting the northern highlands and Cuzco with what is now Chile and Mendoza. The influence of the Incas in the cultural, commercial and religious life was strong. Each group functioned as an independent tribe, with its own leadership and its own language, they all communicated using Quechua, the language of the highlands.

There was a significant population increase during the Inca domination. Some associated this with improved farming techniques, which meant better nutrition, longer life expectancy and lower infant mortality. There were migrations into what is now Puna Argentina from other parts of the highlands, possibly from mitimaes, colonies which the Incas settled along the borders of their empire. Upon the arrival of the Spanish, Puna was active in production and trade.

Location
It is located at the southern entrance of the high plateau known as the Puna Argentina at the foot of Mount Huancar. About 55 km southwest of the provincial route 7 is the small but famous village of Casabindo.

Abra Pampa forms a link between Puna to the west and to the east forests (Yungas) and valleys. It's a very commercial city, being favored by its geographical location. Despite this its unemployment rate is high.

Climate 
Typical for this region of the Altiplano, Abra Pampa has a cool semi-arid climate (Köppen BSk) with two distinct seasons. Throughout the year, afternoon temperatures range form comfortable to warm, but diurnal temperature ranges are very large due to the hot sun and thin air. There is a partly cloudy, thundery wet season with mornings that are merely chilly between December and March, and a rainless, cloudless dry season with freezing to frigid mornings from April to November. The clearest month is July; the cloudiest month is January; and the wettest month is February. 

Population
Although according to newspaper sources of August 2004 Abra Pampa had 16 000 inhabitants, the 2001 INDEC census indicates 7496 inhabitants in urban areas and 9425 inhabitants in the entire municipality.

Economy
Livestock is represented by goats, llamas (American camelids) and sheep and is of vital importance for the city that was founded on August 30, 1883, with the name of Siberia Argentina. The city is located 3484 meters above sea level and was declared unofficially as "capital of Puna" on August 30, 1973.

On the left bank of the River Miraflores, it is set on a large plateau that can be located between the foothills El Aguilar and Cochinoca mountains.

Attractions
Abra Pampa is home to the Huancar Festival and the Feast of Pachamama in August. The Vicuñera de Miraflores, where semi-wild vicuñas are raised, lies within walking distance of the town, in an experimental INTA station.

References

Populated places in Jujuy Province